Sahab Alam Persian: سحاب علم) is an Iranian composer and musician. He plays the strings, three strings, and piano. He was born on December 18, 1989, in Tehran, Iran, and is a member of the Zand group.

Career 
At age 9, Alam started his musical career by playing tombak and daf. After 5 years, he chose taar and setar as his primary instrument and piano as the secondary instrument. After finishing secondary education at the music conservatory, he received a bachelor's degree in music. He studied music with Hoshang Zarif, Dariush Pirniakan, Mostafa Kamal Pourtorab, Esmaeil Tehrani, Mohammad Esmaili, Mohsen Nafar, Mansour Sinki, Vartan Sahakian, Dr. Amin Artman, Mohammad Reza Tafzali, Hamid Reza Dibazar, Sharif Lotfi and Dr. Mohammad Reza AzadehFar. He has also collaborated with Zand group (Ali Zand Vakili).

Awards 
The Navai Hatef group led by Sina Alam and Sahab Alam won third place in the Fajr Festival of 2009.

Albums

Single tracks

References

External links 

Living people
1989 births
Iranian composers
Iranian pianists